Shelly Johnson, A.S.C (born April 28, 1960) is an American cinematographer. He is a frequent collaborator with director Joe Johnston, working with him on films such as Jurassic Park III, The Wolfman and Captain America: The First Avenger.

Life and career 
Johnson grew up in Pasadena, California, where he attended Blair High School and graduated from Pasadena's Art Center College of Design in 1980. His career started with 1987's Maid to Order. He worked on many TV movies such as Everybody's Baby: The Rescue of Jessica McClure, in which he was nominated for an ASC award, before landing his first major motion picture job on Teenage Mutant Ninja Turtles II: The Secret of the Ooze. Johnson returned to TV movies and mini series, most notably The Shining, a remake of the 1980 Stanley Kubrick film. Johnson's first collaboration with Joe Johnston was the third installment in the Jurassic Park franchise. With this major film, Johnson began his foray into the Hollywood scene with The Last Castle, Hidalgo (with Johnston), Sky High, The House Bunny, The Wolfman (with Johnston) and Captain America: The First Avenger. Johnson is a member of the American Society of Cinematographers since 2000.

Filmography

References

External links 

American cinematographers
Living people
People from Pasadena, California
Year of birth uncertain
Blair High School (Pasadena, California) alumni
Art Center College of Design alumni
1960 births